Aamar Tumi is a 1989 Indian Bengali-language film directed by Bimal Ray (Jr.) and produced by Dipti Pal. The film features actors Prosenjit Chatterjee and Farah Naaz in the lead roles. The music was composed by Bappi Lahiri.

Cast 
 Prosenjit Chatterjee
 Farah Naaz
 Subhendu Chatterjee
 Rabi Ghosh
 Biplab Chatterjee
 Shakuntala Barua
 Nayana Das
 Master Shibam
 Sanghamitra Bandyopadhyay

Soundtrack

References

External links

Bengali-language Indian films
1989 films
Films scored by Bappi Lahiri
1980s Bengali-language films